Jayess is an unincorporated community in Lawrence County, Mississippi, United States.

History
Jayess was named for J.S. Butterfield, owner of the Butterfield Lumber Company. J.S. Butterfield's initials were used until the Postal Department changed it in when opened in 1912, to create the name "Jayess.". A post office is still located at the settlement.

Both a sawmill and a cotton gin were located in Jayess.

A klavern of the Ku Klux Klan was located in Jayess during the early 1960s.

The Jayess Baptist Church is located at the settlement.  Located west of Jayess is the Boyd-Cothern House, constructed in 1837, and listed on the National Register of Historic Places in 1980.

Notable people
 Jimmy Boyd, singer, musician, and actor best known for 1950s holiday hit "I Saw Mommy Kissing Santa Claus."
Clem Nettles, member of the Mississippi House of Representatives.
Ineva May-Pittman, civil rights activist; recipient of Jackson, Mississippi City Council's 2015 "Woman of the Year" award.

References

Unincorporated communities in Lawrence County, Mississippi
Unincorporated communities in Mississippi